The Jaguar C-X17 is a concept crossover SUV designed by Jaguar Land Rover and unveiled at the 2013 Frankfurt Motor Show. It is the first ever Jaguar crossover SUV. 

It was expected that the C-X17 concept would evolve into a production model, and at the 2015 North American International Auto Show it was announced that the production version for 2016 would be called the F-Pace.

Design
The C-X17 features an advanced aluminium monocoque architecture on to which future models will be based on, branded as iQ[Al]. 

The C-X17 is powered by the 3.0-litre 6-cylinder petrol engine found in the Jaguar XF, Jaguar XJ and Jaguar F-Type and is equipped with a rear-biased intelligent all-wheel drive system. The all-aluminium suspension is complemented by torque vectoring, which brakes the inside wheel. The platform is designed to handle a new range of 2.0-litre four-cylinder engines designed by Jaguar Land Rover as well as the current six-cylinder engine range.

References

External links

Jaguar C-X17 media information

C-X17
Compact sport utility vehicles
Luxury sport utility vehicles
Crossover sport utility vehicles